Tomasz Pauliński (born 27 May 1989) is a Polish Paralympic athlete who competes in shot put at international track and field competitions. He is a World champion and a European champion, he competed at the 2020 Summer Paralympics where he finished in fourth place in the shot put F34. He is also the European record holder for the shot put in his sports classification.

References

1989 births
Living people
Sportspeople from Bydgoszcz
Paralympic athletes of Poland
Polish male shot putters
Athletes (track and field) at the 2020 Summer Paralympics
Medalists at the World Para Athletics Championships
World Para Athletics Championships winners
Medalists at the World Para Athletics European Championships
20th-century Polish people
21st-century Polish people